Antigone is the daughter of Oedipus and his mother Jocasta in Greek mythology.

Antigone or Antigoni may also refer to:

People 
Antigone (mythology), several characters in Greek mythology
Antigone of Epirus (  317–295 BC), daughter of Berenice I of Egypt and wife of Pyrrhus of Epirus
Antigone Foster, Australian singer and songwriter based in the UK, known professionally as Antigone
Antigone of Gloucester, Countess of Tankerville (  1428–1450), daughter of Humphrey Plantagenet, Duke of Gloucester
Antigone Kefala (1935–2022), Australian poet and prose-writer of Greek-Romanian heritage
Antigone of Macedon, daughter of Cassander, mother of Berenice I of Egypt
Antigoni Papadopoulou (born 1954), Cypriot politician
Antigoni Psychrami, Greek singer
Antigoni Roumpesi (born 1983), Greek water polo player
Antigone, pseudonym of Antonio Papasso (born 1932), Italian painter and engraver

Arts 
Antigone (Sophocles play), by Sophocles
Antigone (Mendelssohn) (1841), a suite of incidental music by Felix Mendelssohn to Sophocles' play
Antigone (1961 film), a Greek film based on Sophocles' play
Antigone (1966 film), an Australian television play adaptation
Antigone (1970 film), a Norwegian film of the 1970s
Antigone (2019 film), a Canadian film directed by Sophie Deraspe
Antigone (Euripides play), by Euripides
 , a 1638 play by Jean Rotrou
Antigone (Anouilh play), Jean Anouilh's play
Antigone (Cocteau play), Jean Cocteau's play, based on Sophocles
Antigone (Garnier play), a 1580 play by Robert Garnier
Antigone (Brecht play), a 1948 play by Bertolt Brecht
Antigonae, a 1949 opera adaptation of the myth by Carl Orff
Antigonai, an opera by Carlos Stella
Antigone (Honegger), a 1927 opera by Arthur Honegger
Antigone (album), a 2004 album by metalcore band Heaven Shall Burn

Other uses 
ANTIGONE, mathematical software
Antigone (bird), a genus of cranes
Antigone (island), one of the Princes' Islands
Antigone, Montpellier, a redeveloped urban area in Montpellier, France
129 Antigone, an asteroid
French submarine Antigone, 1916–1935
HMS Antigone, a fictional Royal Navy light cruiser in Warren Tute's novel The Cruiser

See also 
 
 Antigona (disambiguation)
 Antigonea (disambiguation)
 Antigonia (disambiguation)
 Antigonus (disambiguation)
 Antigens, molecules